Sophina Brown Simmons (born September 18, 1976) is an American television actress. She starred as Raina Troy in the CBS legal drama Shark from 2006 to 2008, and later joined the cast of another CBS drama, Numbers, playing Nikki Betancourt from 2008 to 2010.

Career
Right after graduating from college, Brown got one of her first professional jobs in The National Tour of the musical Fame. Soon afterward, she made her Broadway debut in The Lion King. On television, she guest-starred on Law & Order and Law & Order: Special Victims Unit, before was cast as regular in the CBS legal drama series Shark opposite James Woods. The series ran from 2006 to 2008. Brown later was cast in the CBS drama series Numbers, wherein she played Nikki Betancourt, an "adrenaline junkie" and former "loose cannon" LAPD officer. She joined the series in 2008 and remained to its finale in 2010.

In early 2010s, Brown has had number of guest-starring roles on television, include Castle, Brothers & Sisters, The Good Wife, and NCIS. From 2013 to 2014, she co-starred in the short-lived ABC Family series Ravenswood. In 2016, Brown was cast in the NBC drama Cruel Intentions, based on the 1999 film of same name. As of 2021, Sophina Brown is starring on the BET series Twenties by Lena Waithe.

Personal life
Brown was born in Saginaw, Michigan. She has a BFA in Theatre Performance from the University of Michigan.

Brown married actor and Shark co-star Henry Simmons in May 2010.

Filmography

Film

Television

References

External links
 

Actresses from Michigan
People from Saginaw, Michigan
American musical theatre actresses
American television actresses
1976 births
Living people
University of Michigan School of Music, Theatre & Dance alumni
21st-century American actresses
African-American actresses